Gerhart Moritz Riegner (September 12, 1911 in Berlin – December 3, 2001 in Geneva) was a German philosopher and the secretary-general of the World Jewish Congress from 1965 to 1983.

Life 

On August 8, 1942, he sent the famous Riegner Telegram through diplomatic channels to Stephen Samuel Wise, president of the World Jewish Congress. (However, Wise did not receive it until the end of the month. The source of the information was Eduard Schulte, the anti-Nazi chief executive officer of the prominent German company Giesche (part of Silesian-American Corporation) that employed high-level Nazi officials.

His telegram was the first official communication about the planned Holocaust. It read in part:"Have received through foreign office following message from Riegner Geneva STOP Received alarming report that in Führers headquarters plan discussed and under consideration all Jews in countries occupied or controlled Germany number 3½ to 4 million should after deportation and concentration in East at one blow exterminated to resolve once and for all Jewish question in Europe.

Never did I feel so strongly the sense of abandonment, powerlessness and loneliness as when I sent messages of disaster and horror to the free world and no one believed me."

Awards and honors
In 1994 he received the Four Freedom Award for the Freedom of Worship

In 2001 Riegner received an Honorary Doctorate from the University of Lucerne.

References

External links
Article on Eduard Schulte in the Holocaust Encyclopedia with an image of the cable originating from Gerhart Riegner
A Final Hitler Decision for the "Final Solution"? The Riegner Telegram Reconsidered by Christopher R. Browning

1911 births
2001 deaths
People from Berlin
Graduate Institute of International and Development Studies alumni
20th-century German Jews
The Holocaust and the United States
Recipients of the Four Freedoms Award